Norman Clarke may refer to:

 Norman Clarke (basketball), Canadian basketball player
 Norman Clarke (bishop), Anglican bishop of Plymouth
 Norman Clarke (footballer) (born 1942), Northern Irish footballer
 Norman Clarke (physicist), British physicist and politician